Isert Kelly Castle is a tower house and National Monument located in County Galway, Ireland.

Location

History

The tower house was built some time in the 15th century. It belonged to the MacHubert Burkes, who claim descent from Hubert, son of Richard Óg de Burgh, a Hiberno-Norman knight of the 13th century. It later passed to the MacRedmonds, another branch of the Burkes (de Burgo, de Búrca).

It was burned by the Ó Doṁnaill (O'Donnells) in 1596. A fireplace within is dated 1604.

After the Cromwellian conquest of Ireland Isert Kelly Castle passed to Dudley Persse. William Persse owned it in the 19th century.

Substantial excavation took place in 2014–16.

Description
Secondary buildings may have included a hall, stables, cottages and barns.

The first floor is vaulted and has a fireplace. The second floor has arcades. The main room is at the third storey with a dated fireplace of 1604 with the initials W.H.

References

External links

National Monuments in County Galway
Castles in County Galway